Musa Al-Koni is a Libyan politician and diplomat. He served as the deputy prime minister of Libya's Government of National Accord from March 2016 to 2 January 2017. He represented southern Libya, where he is from. He was also one of the vice presidents of the Presidential Council until his resignation. Al-Koni resigned due to the GNA's failure to govern the country.

From 2005 until around the time of the 2011 civil war, he served as the consul general of Libya in Mali. He was accused by the Malian government of trying to recruit Tuareg mercenaries to fight for Gaddafi.

References

1965 births
Living people
Libyan politicians
Libyan diplomats
Ambassadors of Libya to Mali
Members of the Presidential Council (Libya)
People from Sabha, Libya